The 2018–19 Georgia Lady Bulldogs women's basketball team represents University of Georgia in the 2018–19 NCAA Division I women's basketball season. The Lady Bulldogs, led by fourth-year head coach Joni Taylor, play their home games at Stegeman Coliseum and were members of the Southeastern Conference. They finished the season 18–12, 9–7 in SEC play to finish in a tie for sixth place. They lost in the second round of the SEC women's tournament to Arkansas. Despite having 18 wins, they were not invited to a postseason tournament.

Previous season
The Lady Bulldogs finished the 2017–18 season 26–7, 12–4 in SEC play to finish in a tie for second place. They advanced to the semifinals of the SEC women's tournament, nationally ranked 19th, where they lost to 8th-ranked South Carolina. They received an at-large bid to the NCAA women's tournament where they defeated Mercer in the first round before losing to Duke in the second round.

Roster

Rankings

^Coaches' Poll did not release a second poll at the same time as the AP.

Schedule

|-
!colspan=9 style=| Non-conference regular season

|-
!colspan=9 style=| SEC regular season

|-
!colspan=9 style=| SEC Women's Tournament

References

Georgia Lady Bulldogs basketball seasons
Georgia
Bulldogs
Bulldogs